The 3rd Annual Indonesian Movie Awards was held on May 15, 2009, at the Tennis Indoor Senayan, Central Jakarta. The award show was hosted by Luna Maya, Ruben Onsu, and Raffi Ahmad. And the nominations have been announced for the category of Favorite, which will be chosen by the public via SMS. As for the category of Best, will be selected by a jury that has been appointed. For the category which contested are the same as last year's celebration.

Selection of winners for all categories of Best determined by the jury consisting of Ratna Riantiarno, Niniek L. Karim, Didi Petet, El Manik, Darwis Triadi, and Jajang C. Noer. While the category of Favorite, determined based on SMS polling majority of public. Of the 42 films were registered following the 2009 of celebration, only 16 film titles were entered into nomination.

Laskar Pelangi and Perempuan Berkalung Sorban is the film with the most awards this year, respectively taking home five and four awards. Gara-Gara Bola won two awards, and other films taking home one award each.

Nominees and winners

Best
Winners are listed first and highlighted in boldface.

Favorite
Winners are listed first and highlighted in boldface.

Film with most nominations and awards

Most nominations

The following film received most nominations:

Most wins
The following film received most nominations:

References

External links
 Berita Indonesian Movie Awards 2009 

Indonesian
2009 in Indonesia
Indonesian Movie Actor Awards